The Siliguri Municipal Corporation election, 2015 is an election of members to the Siliguri Municipal Corporation which governs Siliguri. The 2015 SMC election was conducted on 25 April 2015 to elect members to all 47 wards of the municipal corporation.

Result 
The Left Front formed the board in the Siliguri Municipal Corporation. TMC jumping from 14 to 17 seats. Indian National Congress had fallen to 4 seats.

Results By Ward
The results were announced in April 2015, The Left Front has won 23 wards while Trinamool Congress and INC have won 17 and 4 wards respectively.

References

Siliguri
Siliguri
Local elections in West Bengal
2015 elections in India